Tom Jones: The Right Time is a six-episode television series hosted by Tom Jones. The 30-minute episodes were first broadcast on ITV in the United Kingdom in 1992 and featured music and interviews in front of a live audience. The show was also broadcast in the United States on VH1 in 1992–93. John Marchese of the New York Times News Service described it as a "whirlwind briefing on the history of pop music". Guest stars included Bob Geldof, Cyndi Lauper, The Chieftains and Stevie Wonder.

Themes

Across the six episodes, Jones traces the evolution of pop music, and how it has been influenced by gospel, soul, country and rhythm and blues music. The final episode of the series, a special with Stevie Wonder, was nominated for a CableACE Award for best International Music Special or Series having been broadcast on VH1. In addition to guest artists performing, Jones also performed alongside many of them. He described singing lead vocals on EMF's "Unbelievable" as "his favourite episode".

Episode list

References

External links

1992 British television series debuts
1992 British television series endings
Television series by ITV Studios
Television shows produced by Central Independent Television
English-language television shows